Tonårsdrömmar is the debut album from Noice, released on 30 October 1979. The band was allowed to record the single, Television/Du é inte man in the Rock -79 talent show, and was later allowed to record the album that would stay on the Swedish albums chart for 18 weeks, peaking at no. 2 in 1980.

The album was rereleased on CD in 1993. The album is one of the titles in the 2009 book Tusen svenska klassiker.

Track listing
Side one
 "I natt é hela stan vår" - 2:29
 "En kväll i tunnelbanan" - 3:54
 "Jag vill inte va' (som alla andra)" - 2:07
 "Nina" - 3:08
 "Du é inte man" - 3:37
Side two
 "Television" - 3:22
 "Rock 'n' roll å droger" - 2:41
 "Jag kommer inte in" - 2:44
 "Jag är trött på tonårsdrömmen" - 1:56
 "Din tid kommer också" - 2:46
 "Nu bryter jag upp" - 4:23

Personnel
 Hasse Carlsson - singer, guitar
 Peo Thyrén - electric bass
 Freddie Hansson - keyboard
 Robert Klasen - drums

Chart positions

References

1979 debut albums
Noice albums